Meredith Jones may refer to:

 Meredith Jones (athlete), Australian Paralympic athlete
 Meredith Jones (author) (born 1965), Australian-British cultural theorist
 Meredith Leam Jones (1926–1996), American zoologist